The 2012 Copa de la Reina de Fútbol was the 30th edition of the Spanish women's football national cup. It took place between 8 and 10 June in RFEF's Ciudad del Fútbol in Las Rozas, and it was contested following the end of the 2011–12 Primera División as a final four by the top four teams in the table, a major cut from the previous edition's fourteen contestants. On April 8, defending champion Barcelona became the first team to qualify for the competition. Athletic Club and Espanyol also qualified in subsequent weeks, and Rayo Vallecano clinched the last spot by earning a 1–1 draw against contender Levante in the final date.

Espanyol won its sixth title to tie with Levante as the competition's most successful team by beating Rayo Vallecano in a penalty shootout and Athletic, which reached the final for the first time, after extra time. Mari Paz Vilas, who scored Espanyol's winning goal six minutes from the penalty shootout, was named the tournament's most valuable player.

Qualified teams
Top four positions of the 2011-12 Spanish First Division.

Results

Semifinals

Final

References

Women
Copa de la Reina
Copa de la Reina de Fútbol seasons